Bharla Malwat Rakhtaana, (meaning: Blood Filled Forehead) is a 2014 Marathi film directed by Anup Jagdale. Vignaharta Productions has produced the film and is said to be a remake of 1988 Hindi film Khoon Bhari Maang.

Cast
 Teja Devkar as Lakshmi
 Sanjay Khapre as Na.Da.Patil
 Kavita Radheshyam as Mona / Atyaa
 Milind Shinde as Subhan Rao

Production
Anup Jagdale reportedly signed actress Kavita Radheshyam to play the role which was originally played by Rekha.
An online vote was held on rediff.com to test if users believed Kavita Radheshyam could match actress Rekha in this latest remake.
Filmmaker Rakesh Roshan got upset with the Marathi remake of his 1988 classic and sent a legal notice to director Anup Jagdale.
Jagdale's  response indicated that the film was not a remake of Khoon Bhari Maang.

References

2010s Marathi-language films
2014 films